The Komodo dragon (Varanus komodoensis), also known as the Komodo monitor, is a member of the monitor lizard family Varanidae that is endemic to the Indonesian islands of Komodo, Rinca, Flores, and Gili Motang.

As a result of their size, Komodo dragons are apex predators, and dominate the ecosystems in which they live. Komodo dragons hunt and ambush prey including invertebrates, birds, and mammals. Komodo dragons' group behavior in hunting is exceptional in the reptile world. The diet of Komodo dragons mainly consists of Javan rusa (Rusa timorensis), though they also eat considerable amounts of carrion. Komodo dragons also occasionally attack humans.

Mating begins between May and August, and the eggs are laid in September; as many as 20 eggs are deposited at a time in an abandoned megapode nest or in a self-dug nesting hole. The eggs are incubated for seven to eight months, hatching in April, when insects are most plentiful. Young Komodo dragons are vulnerable and dwell in trees to avoid predators, such as cannibalistic adults. They take 8 to 9 years to mature and are estimated to live up to 30 years.

Komodo dragons were first recorded by Western scientists in 1910. Their large size and fearsome reputation make them popular zoo exhibits. In the wild, their range has contracted due to human activities, and is likely to contract further from the effects of climate change; due to this, they are listed as Endangered by the IUCN Red List. They are protected under Indonesian law, and Komodo National Park was founded in 1980 to aid protection efforts.

Taxonomic history

Komodo dragons were first documented by Europeans in 1910, when rumors of a "land crocodile" reached Lieutenant van Steyn van Hensbroek of the Dutch colonial administration. Widespread notoriety came after 1912, when Peter Ouwens, the director of the Zoological Museum of Bogor, Java, published a paper on the topic after receiving a photo and a skin from the lieutenant, as well as two other specimens from a collector.

The first two live Komodo dragons to arrive in Europe were exhibited in the Reptile House at London Zoo when it opened in 1927. Joan Beauchamp Procter made some of the earliest observations of these animals in captivity and she demonstrated their behaviour at a Scientific Meeting of the Zoological Society of London in 1928.

The Komodo dragon was the driving factor for an expedition to Komodo Island by W. Douglas Burden in 1926. After returning with 12 preserved specimens and two live ones, this expedition provided the inspiration for the 1933 movie King Kong. It was also Burden who coined the common name "Komodo dragon". Three of his specimens were stuffed and are still on display in the American Museum of Natural History.

The Dutch island administration, realizing the limited number of individuals in the wild, soon outlawed sport hunting and heavily limited the number of individuals taken for scientific study. Collecting expeditions ground to a halt with the occurrence of World War II, not resuming until the 1950s and 1960s, when studies examined the Komodo dragon's feeding behavior, reproduction, and body temperature. At around this time, an expedition was planned in which a long-term study of the Komodo dragon would be undertaken. This task was given to the Auffenberg family, who stayed on Komodo Island for 11 months in 1969. During their stay, Walter Auffenberg and his assistant Putra Sastrawan captured and tagged more than 50 Komodo dragons.

Research from the Auffenberg expedition proved enormously influential in raising Komodo dragons in captivity. Research after that of the Auffenberg family has shed more light on the nature of the Komodo dragon, with biologists such as Claudio Ciofi continuing to study the creatures.

Etymology

The Komodo dragon is also sometimes known as the Komodo monitor or the Komodo Island monitor in scientific literature, although this name is uncommon. To the natives of Komodo Island, it is referred to as ora, buaya darat ('land crocodile'), or biawak raksasa ('giant monitor').

Evolutionary history
The evolutionary development of the Komodo dragon started with the genus Varanus, which originated in Asia about 40 million years ago and migrated to Australia, where it evolved into giant forms (the largest of all being the recently extinct Varanus priscus, or "Megalania"), helped by the absence of competing placental carnivorans. Around 15 million years ago, a collision between the continental landmasses of Australia and Southeast Asia allowed these larger varanids to move back into what is now the Indonesian archipelago, extending their range as far east as the island of Timor.

The Komodo dragon is believed to have differentiated from its Australian ancestors about 4 million years ago. However, fossil evidence from Queensland suggests the Komodo dragon actually evolved in Australia, before spreading to Indonesia. The oldest records of the Komodo dragon on Flores date to over 1.3 million years ago.

Dramatic lowering of sea level during the last glacial period uncovered extensive stretches of continental shelf that the Komodo dragon colonised, becoming isolated in their present island range as sea levels rose afterwards. Fossils of extinct Pliocene species of similar size to the modern Komodo dragon, such as Varanus sivalensis, have been found in Eurasia as well, indicating that they fared well even in environments containing competition, such as mammalian carnivores, until the climate change and extinction events that marked the beginning of the Pleistocene.

Genetic analysis of mitochondrial DNA shows the Komodo dragon to be the closest relative (sister taxon) of the lace monitor (V. varius), with their common ancestor diverging from a lineage that gave rise to the crocodile monitor (Varanus salvadorii) of New Guinea. A 2021 study showed that during the Miocene, Komodo dragons had hybridized with the ancestors of the Australian sand monitor (V. gouldii), thus providing further evidence that the Komodo dragon had once inhabited Australia. Genetic analysis indicates that the population from northern Flores is genetically distinct from other populations of the species.

Description

According to Guinness World Records, an average adult male will weigh  and measure , while an average female will weigh  and measure . The largest wild specimen had a length , a snout-vent length (SVL)  and a mass of  excluding stomach contents.

Its saliva is frequently blood-tinged because its teeth are almost completely covered by gingival tissue that is naturally lacerated during feeding. It also has a long, yellow, deeply forked tongue. Komodo dragon skin is reinforced by armoured scales, which contain tiny bones called osteoderms that function as a sort of natural chain-mail. The only areas lacking osteoderms on the head of the adult Komodo dragon are around the eyes, nostrils, mouth margins, and pineal eye, a light-sensing organ on the top of the head. Where lizards typically have one or two varying patterns or shapes of osteoderms, komodos have four: rosette, platy, dendritic, and vermiform. This rugged hide makes Komodo dragon skin a poor source of leather. Additionally, these osteoderms become more extensive and variable in shape as the Komodo dragon ages, ossifying more extensively as the lizard grows. These osteoderms are absent in hatchlings and juveniles, indicating that the natural armor develops as a product of age and competition between adults for protection in intraspecific combat over food and mates.

Senses

As with other varanids, Komodo dragons have only a single ear bone, the stapes, for transferring vibrations from the tympanic membrane to the cochlea. This arrangement means they are likely restricted to sounds in the 400 to 2,000 hertz range, compared to humans who hear between 20 and 20,000 hertz. They were formerly thought to be deaf when a study reported no agitation in wild Komodo dragons in response to whispers, raised voices, or shouts. This was disputed when London Zoological Garden employee Joan Procter trained a captive specimen to come out to feed at the sound of her voice, even when she could not be seen.

It can distinguish colours, but has poor visual discrimination of stationary objects.

As with many other reptiles, the Komodo dragon primarily relies on its tongue to detect, taste, and smell stimuli, with the vomeronasal sense using the Jacobson's organ, rather than using the nostrils. It only has a few taste buds in the back of its throat. Its scales, some of which are reinforced with bone, have sensory plaques connected to nerves to facilitate its sense of touch. The scales around the ears, lips, chin, and soles of the feet may have three or more sensory plaques.

Behaviour and ecology

The Komodo dragon prefers hot and dry places and typically lives in dry, open grassland, savanna, and tropical forest at low elevations. As an ectotherm, it is most active in the day, although it exhibits some nocturnal activity. Komodo dragons are solitary, coming together only to breed and eat. To catch out-of-reach prey, the Komodo dragon may stand on its hind legs and use its tail as a support. As it matures, its claws are used primarily as weapons, as its great size makes climbing impractical.

Because of its large size and habit of sleeping in these burrows, it is able to conserve body heat throughout the night and minimise its basking period the morning after. The Komodo dragon hunts in the afternoon, but stays in the shade during the hottest part of the day. These special resting places, usually located on ridges with cool sea breezes, are marked with droppings and are cleared of vegetation. They serve as strategic locations from which to ambush deer.

Diet

Komodo dragons are apex predators. They are carnivores; although they have been considered as eating mostly carrion, they will frequently ambush live prey with a stealthy approach. When suitable prey arrives near a dragon's ambush site, it will suddenly charge at the animal at high speeds and go for the underside or the throat.

Komodo dragons do not deliberately allow the prey to escape with fatal injuries but try to kill prey outright using a combination of lacerating damage and blood loss. They have been recorded as killing wild pigs within seconds, and observations of Komodo dragons tracking prey for long distances are likely misinterpreted cases of prey escaping an attack before succumbing to infection.

Komodo dragons eat by tearing large chunks of flesh and swallowing them whole while holding the carcass down with their forelegs. For smaller prey up to the size of a goat, their loosely articulated jaws, flexible skulls, and expandable stomachs allow them to swallow prey whole. The undigested vegetable contents of a prey animal's stomach and intestines are typically avoided. Copious amounts of red saliva the Komodo dragons produce help to lubricate the food, but swallowing is still a long process (15–20 minutes to swallow a goat). A Komodo dragon may attempt to speed up the process by ramming the carcass against a tree to force it down its throat, sometimes ramming so forcefully that the tree is knocked down. A small tube under the tongue that connects to the lungs allows it to breathe while swallowing.

After eating up to 80% of its body weight in one meal, it drags itself to a sunny location to speed digestion, as the food could rot and poison the dragon if left undigested in its stomach for too long. Because of their slow metabolism, large dragons can survive on as few as 12 meals a year. After digestion, the Komodo dragon regurgitates a mass of horns, hair, and teeth known as the gastric pellet, which is covered in malodorous mucus. After regurgitating the gastric pellet, it rubs its face in the dirt or on bushes to get rid of the mucus.

The eating habits of Komodo dragons follow a hierarchy, with the larger animals generally eating before the smaller ones. The largest male typically asserts his dominance and the smaller males show their submission by use of body language and rumbling hisses. Dragons of equal size may resort to "wrestling". Losers usually retreat, though they have been known to be killed and eaten by victors.

The Komodo dragon's diet is wide-ranging, and includes invertebrates, other reptiles (including smaller Komodo dragons), birds, bird eggs, small mammals, monkeys, wild boar, goats, pigs, deer, horses, and water buffalo. Young Komodos will eat insects, eggs, geckos, and small mammals, while adults prefer to hunt large mammals. Occasionally, they attack and bite humans. Sometimes they consume human corpses, digging up bodies from shallow graves. This habit of raiding graves caused the villagers of Komodo to move their graves from sandy to clay ground, and pile rocks on top of them, to deter the lizards. The Komodo dragon may have evolved to feed on the extinct dwarf species of Stegodon (a member of Proboscidea related to elephants) that once lived on Flores, according to evolutionary biologist Jared Diamond.

The Komodo dragon drinks by sucking water into its mouth via buccal pumping (a process also used for respiration), lifting its head, and letting the water run down its throat.

Saliva
Although previous studies proposed that Komodo dragon saliva contains a variety of highly septic bacteria that would help to bring down prey, research in 2013 suggested that the bacteria in the mouths of Komodo dragons are ordinary and similar to those found in other carnivores. Komodo dragons have good mouth hygiene. To quote Bryan Fry: "After they are done feeding, they will spend 10 to 15 minutes lip-licking and rubbing their head in the leaves to clean their mouth ... Unlike people have been led to believe, they do not have chunks of rotting flesh from their meals on their teeth, cultivating bacteria." Nor do Komodo dragons wait for prey to die and track it at a distance, as vipers do; observations of them hunting deer, boar and in some cases buffalo reveal that they kill prey in less than half an hour.

The observation of prey dying of sepsis would then be explained by the natural instinct of water buffalos, who are not native to the islands where the Komodo dragon lives, to run into water after escaping an attack. The warm, faeces-filled water would then cause the infections. The study used samples from 16 captive dragons (10 adults and six neonates) from three US zoos.

Antibacterial immune factor
Researchers have isolated a powerful antibacterial peptide from the blood plasma of Komodo dragons, VK25. Based on their analysis of this peptide, they have synthesized a short peptide dubbed DRGN-1 and tested it against multidrug-resistant (MDR) pathogens. Preliminary results of these tests show that DRGN-1 is effective in killing drug-resistant bacterial strains and even some fungi. It has the added observed benefit of significantly promoting wound healing in both uninfected and mixed biofilm infected wounds.

Venom

In late 2005, researchers at the University of Melbourne speculated the perentie (Varanus giganteus), other species of monitors, and agamids may be somewhat venomous. The team believes the immediate effects of bites from these lizards were caused by mild envenomation. Bites on human digits by a lace monitor (V. varius), a Komodo dragon, and a spotted tree monitor (V. scalaris) all produced similar effects: rapid swelling, localised disruption of blood clotting, and shooting pain up to the elbow, with some symptoms lasting for several hours.

In 2009, the same researchers published further evidence demonstrating Komodo dragons possess a venomous bite. MRI scans of a preserved skull showed the presence of two glands in the lower jaw. The researchers extracted one of these glands from the head of a terminally ill dragon in the Singapore Zoological Gardens, and found it secreted several different toxic proteins. The known functions of these proteins include inhibition of blood clotting, lowering of blood pressure, muscle paralysis, and the induction of hypothermia, leading to shock and loss of consciousness in envenomated prey. As a result of the discovery, the previous theory that bacteria were responsible for the deaths of Komodo victims was disputed.

Other scientists have stated that this allegation of venom glands "has had the effect of underestimating the variety of complex roles played by oral secretions in the biology of reptiles, produced a very narrow view of oral secretions and resulted in misinterpretation of reptilian evolution." According to these scientists "reptilian oral secretions contribute to many biological roles other than to quickly dispatch prey." These researchers concluded that, "Calling all in this clade venomous implies an overall potential danger that does not exist, misleads in the assessment of medical risks, and confuses the biological assessment of squamate biochemical systems." Evolutionary biologist Schwenk says that even if the lizards have venom-like proteins in their mouths they may be using them for a different function, and he doubts venom is necessary to explain the effect of a Komodo dragon bite, arguing that shock and blood loss are the primary factors.

Reproduction

Mating occurs between May and August, with the eggs laid in September. During this period, males fight over females and territory by grappling with one another upon their hind legs, with the loser eventually being pinned to the ground. These males may vomit or defecate when preparing for the fight. The winner of the fight will then flick his long tongue at the female to gain information about her receptivity. Females are antagonistic and resist with their claws and teeth during the early phases of courtship. Therefore, the male must fully restrain the female during coitus to avoid being hurt. Other courtship displays include males rubbing their chins on the female, hard scratches to the back, and licking. Copulation occurs when the male inserts one of his hemipenes into the female's cloaca. Komodo dragons may be monogamous and form "pair bonds", a rare behavior for lizards.

Female Komodos lay their eggs from August to September and may use several types of locality; in one study, 60% laid their eggs in the nests of orange-footed scrubfowl (a moundbuilder or megapode), 20% on ground level and 20% in hilly areas. The females make many camouflage nests/holes to prevent other dragons from eating the eggs. Clutches contain an average of 20 eggs, which have an incubation period of 7–8 months. Hatching is an exhausting effort for the neonates, which break out of their eggshells with an egg tooth that falls off before long. After cutting themselves out, the hatchlings may lie in their eggshells for hours before starting to dig out of the nest. They are born quite defenseless and are vulnerable to predation. Sixteen youngsters from a single nest were on average 46.5 cm long and weighed 105.1 grams.

Young Komodo dragons spend much of their first few years in trees, where they are relatively safe from predators, including cannibalistic adults, as juvenile dragons make up 10% of their diets. The habit of cannibalism may be advantageous in sustaining the large size of adults, as medium-sized prey on the islands is rare. When the young approach a kill, they roll around in faecal matter and rest in the intestines of eviscerated animals to deter these hungry adults. Komodo dragons take approximately 8 to 9 years to mature, and may live for up to 30 years.

Parthenogenesis

A Komodo dragon at London Zoo named Sungai laid a clutch of eggs in late 2005 after being separated from male company for more than two years. Scientists initially assumed she had been able to store sperm from her earlier encounter with a male, an adaptation known as superfecundation. On 20 December 2006, it was reported that Flora, a captive Komodo dragon living in the Chester Zoo in England, was the second known Komodo dragon to have laid unfertilised eggs: she laid 11 eggs, and seven of them hatched, all of them male. Scientists at Liverpool University in England performed genetic tests on three eggs that collapsed after being moved to an incubator, and verified Flora had never been in physical contact with a male dragon. After Flora's eggs' condition had been discovered, testing showed Sungai's eggs were also produced without outside fertilization. On 31 January 2008, the Sedgwick County Zoo in Wichita, Kansas, became the first zoo in the Americas to document parthenogenesis in Komodo dragons. The zoo has two adult female Komodo dragons, one of which laid about 17 eggs on 19–20 May 2007. Only two eggs were incubated and hatched due to space issues; the first hatched on 31 January 2008, while the second hatched on 1 February. Both hatchlings were males.

Komodo dragons have the ZW chromosomal sex-determination system, as opposed to the mammalian XY system. Male progeny prove Flora's unfertilized eggs were haploid (n) and doubled their chromosomes later to become diploid (2n) (by being fertilized by a polar body, or by chromosome duplication without cell division), rather than by her laying diploid eggs by one of the meiosis reduction-divisions in her ovaries failing. When a female Komodo dragon (with ZW sex chromosomes) reproduces in this manner, she provides her progeny with only one chromosome from each of her pairs of chromosomes, including only one of her two sex chromosomes. This single set of chromosomes is duplicated in the egg, which develops parthenogenetically. Eggs receiving a Z chromosome become ZZ (male); those receiving a W chromosome become WW and fail to develop, meaning that only males are produced by parthenogenesis in this species.

It has been hypothesised that this reproductive adaptation allows a single female to enter an isolated ecological niche (such as an island) and by parthenogenesis produce male offspring, thereby establishing a sexually reproducing population (via reproduction with her offspring that can result in both male and female young). Despite the advantages of such an adaptation, zoos are cautioned that parthenogenesis may be detrimental to genetic diversity.

Encounters with humans

Attacks on humans are rare, but Komodo dragons have been responsible for several human fatalities, in both the wild and in captivity. According to data from Komodo National Park spanning a 38-year period between 1974 and 2012, there were 24 reported attacks on humans, five of them fatal. Most of the victims were local villagers living around the national park.

Conservation

The Komodo dragon is classified by the IUCN as Endangered and is listed on the IUCN Red List. The species' sensitivity to natural and man-made threats has long been recognized by conservationists, zoological societies, and the Indonesian government. Komodo National Park was founded in 1980 to protect Komodo dragon populations on islands including Komodo, Rinca, and Padar. Later, the Wae Wuul and Wolo Tado Reserves were opened on Flores to aid Komodo dragon conservation.

Komodo dragons generally avoid encounters with humans. Older animals will also retreat from humans from a shorter distance away. If cornered, they may react aggressively by gaping their mouth, hissing, and swinging their tail. If they are disturbed further, they may attack and bite. Although there are anecdotes of unprovoked Komodo dragons attacking or preying on humans, most of these reports are either not reputable or have subsequently been interpreted as defensive bites. Only very few cases are truly the result of unprovoked attacks by atypical individuals who lost their fear of humans.

Volcanic activity, earthquakes, loss of habitat, fire, tourism, loss of prey due to poaching, and illegal poaching of the dragons themselves have all contributed to the vulnerable status of the Komodo dragon. A major future threat to the species is climate change via both aridification and sea level rise, which can affect the low-lying habitats and valleys that the Komodo dragon depends on, as Komodo dragons do not range into the higher-altitude regions of the islands they inhabit. Based on projections, climate change will lead to a decline in suitable habitat of 8.4%, 30.2%, or 71% by 2050 depending on the climate change scenario. Without effective conservation actions, populations on Flores are extirpated in all scenarios, while in the more extreme scenarios, only the populations on Komodo and Rinca persist in highly reduced numbers. Rapid climate change mitigation is crucial for conserving the species in the wild. Other scientists have disputed the conclusions about the effects of climate change on Komodo dragon populations.

Under Appendix I of CITES (the Convention on International Trade in Endangered Species), commercial international trade of Komodo dragon skins or specimens is prohibited. Despite this, there are occasional reports of illegal attempts to trade in live Komodo dragons. The most recent attempt was in March 2019, when Indonesian police in the East Java city of Surabaya reported that a criminal network had been caught trying to smuggle 41 young Komodo dragons out of Indonesia. The plan was said to include shipping the animals to several other countries in Southeast Asia through Singapore. It was hoped that the animals could be sold for up to 500 million rupiah (around US$35,000) each. It was believed that the Komodo dragons had been smuggled out of East Nusa Tenggara province through the port at Ende in central Flores.

In 2013, the total population of Komodo dragons in the wild was assessed as 3,222 individuals, declining to 3,092 in 2014 and 3,014 in 2015. Populations remained relatively stable on the bigger islands (Komodo and Rinca), but decreased on smaller islands, such as Nusa Kode and Gili Motang, likely due to diminishing prey availability. On Padar, a former population of Komodo dragons has recently become extinct, of which the last individuals were seen in 1975. It is widely assumed that the Komodo dragon died out on Padar following a major decline of populations of large ungulate prey, for which poaching was most likely responsible.

In captivity

Komodo dragons have long been sought-after zoo attractions, where their size and reputation make them popular exhibits. They are, however, rare in zoos because they are susceptible to infection and parasitic disease if captured from the wild, and do not readily reproduce in captivity. The first Komodo dragons were displayed at London Zoo in 1927. A Komodo dragon was exhibited in 1934 in the United States at the National Zoo in Washington, D.C., but it lived for only two years. More attempts to exhibit Komodo dragons were made, but the lifespan of the animals proved very short, averaging five years in the National Zoological Park. Studies were done by Walter Auffenberg, which were documented in his book The Behavioral Ecology of the Komodo Monitor, eventually allowed for more successful management and breeding of the dragons in captivity. As of May 2009, there were 35 North American, 13 European, one Singaporean, two African, and two Australian institutions which housed captive Komodo dragons.

A variety of behaviors have been observed from captive specimens. Most individuals become relatively tame within a short time, and are capable of recognising individual humans and discriminating between familiar and unfamiliar keepers. Komodo dragons have also been observed to engage in play with a variety of objects, including shovels, cans, plastic rings, and shoes. This behavior does not seem to be "food-motivated predatory behavior".

Even seemingly docile dragons may become unpredictably aggressive, especially when the animal's territory is invaded by someone unfamiliar. In June 2001, a Komodo dragon seriously injured Phil Bronstein, the then-husband of actress Sharon Stone, when he entered its enclosure at the Los Angeles Zoo after being invited in by its keeper. Bronstein was bitten on his bare foot, as the keeper had told him to take off his white shoes and socks, which the keeper stated could potentially excite the Komodo dragon as they were the same colour as the white rats the zoo fed the dragon. Although he survived, Bronstein needed to have several tendons in his foot reattached surgically.

See also

 List of largest extant lizards
 Asian water monitor
 Komodo Indonesian Fauna Museum and Reptile Park
 Papua monitor (Varanus salvadorii), a monitor lizard often asserted to be the longest extant lizard
 Toxicofera, a hypothetical clade encompassing all venomous reptiles, including the Komodo dragon
 Varanus priscus (formerly known as Megalania prisca), a huge extinct varanid lizard of Pleistocene Australia

References

Further reading

External links 
 
 

Apex predators
Articles containing video clips
Endangered fauna of Asia
Endemic fauna of Indonesia
Extant Zanclean first appearances
Fauna of the Lesser Sunda Islands
Komodo National Park
Varanus
National symbols of Indonesia
Reptiles described in 1912
Reptiles of Indonesia
Vertebrate parthenogenesis